is a futuristic hovercar racing game from Koei. Originally an exclusive for the PlayStation 3, it was released for the Xbox 360 in 2007 and then released on the PlayStation 3 on May 29, 2008 in Japan, June 19, 2008 in North America and Australia, and July 15, 2008 in Europe as a download on the PlayStation Network under the title . The PlayStation 3 version was initially delayed because of difficulties with the Unreal Engine 3 on the console, due to the cell processor's architecture.

The game is set in the mid-22nd century Earth, and a handful of immense corporations control virtually all business, politics, and entertainment. Extreme sports have become one of the main sources of entertainment with Fatal Inertia as the most popular. Competitions take place far from cities due to the high level of danger.

There are six different racing environments that are divided into fifty-one courses.

Gameplay
Fatal Inertia has four main craft types, each one having advantages and disadvantages over each other:

Phoenix Class: craft that, though they do not excel, are well balanced on most parameters.
Aurora class: the fastest of all the classes, though with questionable reliability. Suited for adept or advanced players.
Mercury class: light, fast accelerating vehicles with superior handling in contrast to other classes.
Titan class: massive machines that can demolish the competition with their heavy armor and greater firepower, compensating for their poor handling and acceleration.

Though there are only 4 classes there are numerous upgrades that can tune each class to its own unique look, stats, and handling.

Fatal Inertia has a set of non-lethal weapons, mostly centered around magnetic behavior. Most of the weapons have primary fire which projects forwards, and a secondary fire that is projected backwards.

Development 
On August 2, 2007 a playable demo of Fatal Inertia was released on Xbox Live Marketplace.

On May 29, 2008 a multi-language playable demo of Fatal Inertia EX was released on the Japanese PlayStation Store.

On July 15, 2008, the same day as Europe's release, a trial version was also available on the PlayStation Store as a free download.

Fatal Inertia EX
The PlayStation 3 version of the game is a download-only title, and appeared on the Japanese PlayStation Store on May 29, 2008, in North America and Australia on June 19, 2008, and in Europe on July 15, 2008, as part of PlayStation Network's E3 2008 release plan. A number of tweaks and improvements have been made to the title, notably the difficulty level; to this end, EX includes a training venue with eight new tracks, known as the "Fatal Inertia Proving Grounds Facility", as well as a Master difficulty level for veterans. The development team have also adjusted gameplay, including weapons and physics. Controls support the DualShock 3 along with SIXAXIS tilt control for craft steering.

Reception

Both Fatal Inertia and Fatal Inertia EX received "mixed" reviews according to the review aggregation website Metacritic. In Japan, Famitsu X360 gave the former a score of two sevens, one eight, and one seven for a total of 29 out of 40. GameZone gave the Japanese version of the latter an average review, about a month before it was released in the United States.

See also
 F-Zero
 Wipeout (series)

References

External links

2007 video games
Science fiction racing games
Koei games
Multiplayer and single-player video games
PlayStation 3 games
PlayStation Network games
Racing video games
Unreal Engine games
Vehicular combat games
Video games developed in Canada
Video games set in the 22nd century
Xbox 360 games